Xerxes was king of Sophene and Commagene from 228 BC to 212 BC. He was the son and successor of Arsames I.

Name 
Xérxēs is the Greek and Latin (Xerxes, Xerses) transliteration of the Old Iranian Xšaya-ṛšā ("ruling over heroes"), a popular name amongst the rulers of the Persian Achaemenid Empire.

Reign 
Xerxes belonged to the Iranian Orontid dynasty. His father was Arsames I, who ruled Sophene, Commagene and possibly Armenia. Xerxes succeeded his father as the ruler of Sophene and Commagene in 228 BC, while his brother Orontes IV ruled Armenia. In 223 BC, several Seleucid satraps rebelled against King Antiochus III, including Artabazanes (Upper Media), Molon (Lower Media), Alexander (Persis), and Achaeus (Asia Minor). By 220 BC Antiochus had put down most of the rebellions; however, Achaeus was not defeated until 213 BC.

These rebellions help explain Antiochus' subsequent aggressive policy toward his satrap Xerxes. By 212 BC, Antiochus III had invaded the domain of Xerxes and defeated him after laying siege to the city of Arsamosata. Shortly afterwards Antiochus III arranged for Xerxes to marry his sister, Antiochis. However, within the same year she arranged to have her new husband assassinated, thinking that her brother would then be able to take control of Sophene. Whether Xerxes still ruled Commagene by the time of his assassination is not known.

References

Sources 
 
 
 
 
 

3rd-century BC Iranian people
Kings of Sophene
3rd-century BC rulers
Year of birth unknown
Kings of Commagene
212 BC deaths